The Oakland Open was a golf tournament in California on the PGA Tour from 1937 to 1944. It was played in Oakland at the Claremont Country Club in 1937 and at the Sequoyah Country Club from 1938 to 1944.

At age 25, Ben Hogan was nearly broke and on the verge of quitting the tour in early 1938; he finished sixth at the Oakland Open in late January and continued.

Winners
1944 Jim Ferrier
1943 No tournament
1942 Byron Nelson
1941 Leonard Dodson
1940 Jimmy Demaret
1939 Dick Metz
1938 Harry Cooper
1937 Sam Snead

References

Former PGA Tour events
Golf in California
Sports competitions in Oakland, California
Recurring sporting events established in 1937
Recurring sporting events disestablished in 1944